The following list of Carnegie libraries in Maryland provides detailed information on United States Carnegie libraries in Maryland, where 14 libraries were built from 1 grant (for Baltimore, totaling $500,000) awarded by the Carnegie Corporation of New York in 1906.

Key

Carnegie libraries

See also
 Enoch Pratt Free Library, the pre-existing library system to which Carnegie contributed

Notes

References

Note: The above references, while all authoritative, are not entirely mutually consistent. Some details of this list may have been drawn from one of the references without support from the others.  Reader discretion is advised.

Maryland
Libraries
 
Libraries